Leucotmemis lemoulti is a moth of the subfamily Arctiinae. It was described by Rothschild in 1911. It is found in French Guiana.

References
Notes

Sources
 Natural History Museum Lepidoptera generic names catalog

Leucotmemis
Moths described in 1911